Thomasia × formosa is a species of flowering plant in the family Malvaceae and is endemic to a restricted area of the south-west of Western Australia. It is an erect, compact shrub with densely hairy branchlets, hairy, coarsely serrated, egg-shaped to elliptic or oblong leaves, and racemes of pink or purple flowers arranged in leaf axils.

Description
The upper surface of the leaves is wrinkled, the edges have rounded teeth and down-curved edges, and both surfaces are covered with rust-coloured, star-shaped hairs. Flowering occurs in September and October.

Taxonomy and naming
Thomasia × formosa was first formally described in 1974 by Susan Paust in the journal Nuytsia, from specimens collected by Charles Chapman near Three Springs in 1972. The specific epithet (formosa) means "handsome".

This species is an inter-generic hybrid between Thomasia macrocalyx and Lysiosepalum rugosum.

Distribution and habitat
This thomasia grows in mallee woodland, shrubland and heath in a restricted area near Three Springs in the Avon Wheatbelt and Geraldton Sandplains bioregions of south-western Western Australia.

Conservation status
Thomasia × formosa is listed as "Threatened" by the Western Australian Government Department of Biodiversity, Conservation and Attractions, meaning that it is in danger of extinction.

References

Rosids of Western Australia
Plants described in 1974
x formosa